Bessie Wentworth (born Elizabeth Mary Andrews, 20 March 1873 – 6 January 1901) was an English music hall singer and comic entertainer.

She was born in Lambeth, London, where her mother ran a boarding house for theatrical performers.  After leaving school, she worked as a clerk before joining Jack Sheppard's troupe in 1891. She became a principal boy in pantomimes, and a singer of boy roles in operettas, before developing a solo act in music halls.  Although she did not use blackface, she sang plantation songs and coon songs, dressed as a young man wearing a stereotypical costume of open-necked shirt, striped pantaloons, and a large straw hat.  One of her most successful songs was "Looking for a Coon Like Me", written by George Le Brunn with lyrics by John Harrington.

She was very successful in the 1890s, and a popular subject of photographs and postcards of her in masculine poses.  She was portrayed in the costume of a plantation worker in a lithograph by Toulouse-Lautrec, probably from a visit he made to London in 1896.  Her last appearance, at the top of the bill, was in December 1900.

Known as a keen cyclist, she was planning to marry and run a public house with her husband, but died aged 27, in Lambeth, from typhoid fever.

References

1873 births
1901 deaths
Music hall performers